Stephen Hill (born 1 May 1990) is a former Australian rules footballer who played for the Fremantle Football Club in the Australian Football League (AFL).

Junior career
Hill played for West Perth in the WAFL and represented Western Australian in the 2008 AFL Under 18 Championships and after playing some very impressive games was named in the Under 18 All-Australian Team. He was originally tipped to be drafted later in the draft, but in the week leading up to the draft it was widely predicted that Fremantle would select him before Subiaco's Daniel Rich.

AFL career
Hill was drafted with 's first pick, the third overall, in the 2008 AFL Draft. He made his debut during Round 1 of the 2009 AFL season against the Western Bulldogs, kicking a goal with his first kick in AFL football, courtesy of a 50-metre penalty. Hill had some quiet games before playing his best game in the round 6 Western Derby against the Eagles.  Hill gathered 21 possessions, 2 goals and a game high 7 inside 50s in Fremantle's come from behind win, which saw him earn the AFL Rising Star nomination for round 6. In the same game he also polled the 3 Brownlow votes as best on ground. 

Hill improved dramatically over his career at Fremantle, an example being his ability to think quickly and efficiently during games, attributed by his often surges of fast speed when possessing the ball. Hill retired from AFL in August 2021 after an injury plagued season.

Personal life
Until he was drafted by Fremantle, Hill supported the West Coast Eagles. Hill is the older brother of former teammate Bradley Hill and second cousin of former Western Bulldogs and West Coast forward Joshua Hill.

The 2013 AFL Grand Final saw the Hill brothers become the first siblings to play against each other in a Grand Final since the 1912 VFL Grand Final.

Statistics
 Statistics are correct to the end of the 2016 season

|-
|- style="background-color: #EAEAEA"
! scope="row" style="text-align:center" | 2009
|style="text-align:center;"|
| 32 || 22 || 9 || 7 || 155 || 170 || 325 || 69 || 60 || 0.6 || 0.5 || 7.0 || 7.7 || 14.8 || 3.1 || 2.7
|-
! scope="row" style="text-align:center" | 2010
|style="text-align:center;"|
| 32 || 23 || 19 || 15 || 206 || 193 || 399 || 61 || 61 || 0.8 || 0.6 || 9.0 || 8.4 || 17.4 || 2.6 || 2.6
|- style="background-color: #EAEAEA"
! scope="row" style="text-align:center" | 2011
|style="text-align:center;"|
| 32 || 22 || 15 || 13 || 213 || 172 || 385 || 67 || 53 || 0.7 || 0.6 || 9.7 || 7.8 || 17.5 || 3.0 || 2.4
|-
! scope="row" style="text-align:center" | 2012
|style="text-align:center;"|
| 32 || 22 || 10 || 13 || 230 || 160 || 390 || 53 || 70 || 0.4 || 0.6 || 10.4 || 7.3 || 17.7 || 2.4 || 3.2
|- style="background-color: #EAEAEA"
! scope="row" style="text-align:center" | 2013
|style="text-align:center;"|
| 32 || 19 || 12 || 7 || 206 || 158 || 364 || 52 || 49 || 0.6 || 0.4 || 10.8 || 8.3 || 19.2 || 2.7 || 2.6
|-
! scope="row" style="text-align:center" | 2014
|style="text-align:center;"|
| 32 || 20 || 18 || 11 || 303 || 140 || 443 || 53 || 56 || 0.9 || 0.6 || 15.2 || 7.0 || 22.2 || 2.6 || 2.8
|- style="background-color: #EAEAEA"
! scope="row" style="text-align:center" | 2015
|style="text-align:center;"|
| 32 || 23 || 17 || 10 || 362 || 190 || 552 || 88 || 67 || 0.7 || 0.4 || 15.7 || 8.3 || 24.0 || 3.8 || 2.9
|-
! scope="row" style="text-align:center" | 2016
|style="text-align:center;"|
| 32 || 21 || 4 || 7 || 332 || 190 || 522 || 63 || 81 || 0.2 || 0.3 || 15.8 || 9.0 || 24.9 || 3.0 || 3.9
|- class="sortbottom"
! colspan=3| Career
! 172
! 104
! 83
! 2007
! 1373
! 3380
! 506
! 497
! 0.6
! 0.5
! 11.7
! 8.0
! 19.7
! 2.9
! 2.9
|}

References

External links

1990 births
Living people
Fremantle Football Club players
West Perth Football Club players
Peel Thunder Football Club players
Indigenous Australian players of Australian rules football
Australian rules footballers from Western Australia